Pirates Cove is an embayment in Marin County, California, United States, between Muir Beach and Tennessee Cove. A trail leads from the terminus of the California Coastal Trail to a small beach area, surrounded by steep hills and coastal scrub. 

There is also a nude beach called Pirates Cove 5 miles west north west of Pismo Beach and
6.7 miles south south west of Madonna Inn, San Luis Obispo, CA

Notes

Bays of California
Bays of Marin County, California
Landforms of the San Francisco Bay Area
West Marin